The Hollow is an historic property and dwelling located near Markham, Fauquier County, Virginia, U.S. A part of the John Marshall's Leeds Manor Rural Historic District, it was the boyhood home of Chief Justice John Marshall, and includes the second-oldest dated home in the county. Both the property and the district are listed in the Virginia Landmarks Register (2003) and National Register of Historic Places (2004).

The property measures , and is situated about 24 miles north of Warrenton, the Fauquier County seat. It lies just north of the village of Markham and I-66. It is bounded on the west by Leeds Manor Road (State Route 688), on the south by Marshall School Lane, southeast by Beulah Road, east by Naked Mountain, and north by about 38.925° latitude and the Naked Mountain Winery.

It sits on an uncornsed fieldstone foundation. Also on the property are the contributing ruins of a meat house, built about 1763. The house was built by Colonel Thomas Marshall, a multi-term member of the House of Burgesses, county sheriff, clerk of the court, honored soldier and inventor, and father of Chief Justice of the United States Supreme Court John Marshall.

References

External links
John Marshall House, U.S. Route 17 vicinity, Marshall, Fauquier County, VA: 7 photos, 34 measured drawings, and 4 data pages at Historic American Buildings Survey

Historic American Buildings Survey in Virginia
Houses on the National Register of Historic Places in Virginia
Houses completed in 1764
Houses in Fauquier County, Virginia
National Register of Historic Places in Fauquier County, Virginia
1764 establishments in Virginia